Marianna Debes Dahl (born 24 November 1947) is a  Faroese writer. She was born  in 1947 in Vestmanna and grew up in Tórshavn.
She trained as a school teacher in 1975 and worked in that capacity for some years, but now is a full-time writer; she has also prepared broadcasting material for Faroese radio (Kringvarp Føroya). She was the president for the Association of Writers of the Faroe Islands from 1980 to 1981, being the first woman to hold this post. She was also the first woman to write an autobiography in Faroese, which she published as Úti á leysum oyggjum (Out on loose islands) in 1997.

Bibliography 
She has cultivated a number of different genres. Since her debut in 1975 she has written books for small children, children, youth and adults, short stories, novels, travelogues, plays and translations, including Kringvarp Føroya, which she translated, edited and prepared for Faroese radio. Her first book was the children's book Burtur á heiði, which she wrote for a competition and won. In 1978 she received the Barnamentanarheiðursløn Tórshavnar býráðs, a cultural prize of Tórshavn City Council bestowed for material written for children and awarded annually in September since 1976.

Novels
Lokkalogi, Forlagið Fannir, 1984
Onglalag, 1986
Faldalín, 1988
Vívil, 1992

Autobiographies
Úti á leysum oyggjum, 1997

Short stories
Millumleikur, 1978
Fløkjan, 1978
Lepar, 1980
Síðsta skúlaárið, 1980

Children's books
Burtur á heiði, 1975
Dirdri, 1979
Skilnaður, 1981

Books for small children
Bjarta og snigilin, 1983
Døgg er dottin, 1984
Hanna og Hóri, 1984
Hóri letur upp, 1986
Sturli súkklar, 1985
Alvi er og ferðast, 1986
Tunnuflakin, 1990

Picture books
Sonurin, 1990 (La Filo in Esperanto)

Books for teaching in the Faroese language for children
Ása fer í skúla, 1983

Travelogues
Latið altíð sólina skína, 1982

Plays
Skálatoftir, 1979 (written together with J.S. Hansen)
Bardagabørn, 1990

Translations
Uppreisnin, 1982, stories from South Africa

Translated and edited radio plays for Kringvarp Føroya's radio 
Victor (about the singer Jara from Chile)
Monir (from Iran)
Chico Mendes (from Brazil)
Miriam Makeba (from South Africa)
Menn undir sól (from Palestine)
Zosia (stories from the Soviet Union from the World War II)
Tað langa brævið (from Senegal)
Edith Piaf (from France)

Awards 
1978 — Barnamentanarheiðursløn Tórshavnar býráðs

References 

1947 births
Living people
Faroese children's writers
Faroese short story writers
Faroese women writers
Faroese women novelists
Faroese Children's Literature Prize recipients
People from Tórshavn
Danish women short story writers
Faroese women children's writers